Nargis Bandishoeva (October 8, 1966 - September 21, 1991) was a popular pop singer from Tajikistan.

She was born in Dushanbe into the family of the well-known composers Hukumatshoh Bandishoev (October 7, 1938 - 2013) and his wife Bunafsha Bekova.

On September 21, 1991 Bandishoeva died in a car accident.

References

External links
Nargis Bandishoeva's photo from AsiaPlus News agency Flickr

Tajikistani musicians
1966 births
1991 deaths
Pamiri people
20th-century Tajikistani musicians
20th-century Tajikistani singers